Michael Bümel (17th century) was a German scientific instrument maker. He was a maker of surveying instruments, active in Nuremberg between 1613 and 1633.

External links 
 

Year of birth missing
Year of death missing
German scientific instrument makers
Engineers from Nuremberg